Varennes-lès-Narcy (literally Varennes near Narcy) is a commune in the Nièvre department and Bourgogne-Franche-Comté region of east-central France.

Population

See also
Communes of the Nièvre department

References

Communes of Nièvre